Day Mirdad (also known as Jilga) is a district in the south of Wardak Province, Afghanistan. The capital of the district is Miran city. The district used to be known as Jilga.

Demographics and population
Like in the rest of Afghanistan, no exact population numbers are available. The Afghan Ministry of Rural Rehabilitation & Development (MRRD) along with UNHCR and Central Statistics Office (CSO) of Afghanistan estimates the population of the district to be around 28,865. According to AIMS and UNHCR, Hazaras make up the majority of the population 90% and the rest 10% others.

Geography
Day Mirdad is located in the south of Wardak Province. To the north it borders Markazi Bihsud and Jalrez, to the south Chak, to the east Nirkh, to the west Nawur District of Ghazni Province.

Day Mirdad is home to some historical forts and towers. Arg, which is located between Moka and Dada khel, Para Qala, Kafer Qala which is located in Bubak and Kafer Qala, which is located in Chatoo. Day Mirdad is an agricultural district that has apples and apricot orchard.

The security situation of Day Mirdad is better than other districts of Wardak Province, but on 16 May 2010, there was war between Hazara tribes and Kuchi (Nomid ) tribes In Ghalm Dasht and it was continuous up to 12 pm Wardak Governar Mohammad Alim Fidayi said that the Afghan National Army can stop this war between Hazara and Kuchi.

References

External links
Map of Day Mirdad district (PDF)

Districts of Maidan Wardak Province
Hazarajat